Hercules and Antaeus is an early 16th-century bronze sculpture by Pier Jacopo di Antonio Alari-Bonacolsi. The Gonzaga family court sculptor based this group on a classical marble of Hercules and Antaeus which is now in the Pitti Palace in Florence. The statue was given to the Victoria and Albert Museum by Dr. Walter Leo Hildburgh, F. S. A., in 1956.

References

Sculptures of Heracles
16th-century sculptures
Bronze sculptures in the United Kingdom
Sculptures of the Victoria and Albert Museum